Type 21 class may refer to:

 Type 21 frigate/Amazon-class frigate
 Type 021-class missile boat
 Type XXI U-boat